Martha Alter (8 February 1904 – 3 June 1976) was an American pianist, music teacher and composer.

Life and career
Martha Alter was born in New Bloomfield, Pennsylvania, to parents David Boyd and Daisy Myrl Alter. She graduated from Vassar College in 1925. Alter continued her studies, receiving a master's in musicology from Columbia University and a master's of music composition from Eastman School of Music, studying with Ernest Hutcheson, Rubin Goldmark, Howard Hanson and Bernard Rogers.

She taught at Vassar College from 1929-1931 and took a position teaching music at Connecticut College in 1942. She died in Newport, Pennsylvania, and her papers are housed at the Vassar College Libraries.

Works
Selected compositions include:

O Bethlehem
Peace
Bill George, march and song for baritone and orchestra, poem by Malcolm Cowley
Anthony Cotnstock or A Puritan's Progress, ballet
Groceries and Notions, drama with Gertrude Brown, book by K.K. Doughtie

References

1904 births
1976 deaths
20th-century classical composers
American women classical composers
American classical composers
20th-century American women musicians
20th-century American musicians
20th-century American composers
20th-century women composers